Thomas Whitfield Davidson (September 23, 1876 – January 26, 1974) was a United States district judge of the United States District Court for the Northern District of Texas.

Education and career

Born in Harrison County, Texas, Davidson read law to enter the bar in 1903. He briefly attended East Texas State Normal College (now Texas A&M University–Commerce) before studying at the University of Chicago and then Columbia University. He was in private practice in Marshall, Texas from 1903 to 1907. He was the city attorney of Marshall 1907 to 1914, thereafter resuming his private practice in Dallas, Texas until 1920. Davidson was a member of the Texas Senate from 1920 to 1922, and was lieutenant governor of Texas from 1923 to 1925 serving under Governor Pat Morris Neff. He then returned to private practice in Dallas until 1936.

Federal judicial service

On January 22, 1936, Davidson was nominated by President Franklin D. Roosevelt to a seat on the United States District Court for the Northern District of Texas vacated by Judge Edward Roscoe Meek. Davidson was confirmed by the United States Senate on January 30, 1936, and received his commission on February 5, 1936. He served as Chief Judge from 1954 to 1959, and assumed senior status on November 1, 1965, holding that position until his death on January 26, 1974.

References

Sources
 

1876 births
1974 deaths
Judges of the United States District Court for the Northern District of Texas
United States district court judges appointed by Franklin D. Roosevelt
20th-century American judges
Democratic Party Texas state senators
Lieutenant Governors of Texas
United States federal judges admitted to the practice of law by reading law